The Clemson Tigers men's basketball teams of 1980–1989 represented Clemson University in NCAA college basketball competition.

1979–80

1980–81

1981–82

1982–83

1983–84

1984–85

1985–86

1986–87

1987–88

1988–89

References

Games: 
Coaches: 

1980